Richard Henry Jones (born 5 June 1926) was an Australian rules footballer who played with South Melbourne in the Victorian Football League (VFL).

Jones, a rover, joined South Melbourne from East Fremantle, but hailed from rural Western Australia.

He kicked a goal in all but one of his 17 games and topped South Melbourne's goal-kicking with 27 majors. During the year he was acting vice-captain.

In 1950 he returned to Western Australia and captain-coached Boulder City to a Goldfields National Football League premiership.

Jones resumed his VFL career in 1951 but only appeared in the opening two rounds of the season.

The next stage of his career was spent in South Australia, starting at Glenelg in 1952. He stopped playing football at the end of the year and concentrated on his police career, before returning briefly in 1956.

In 1957 he was appointed captain-coach of West Torrens and guided them to a fourth-place finish that year. He retired as a player in 1958 but stayed on as coach and was then involved in controversy when he chose to delist aging club great Bob Hank.

He was a television and radio commentator in the SANFL during the 1970s and 1980s.

References

1926 births
Australian rules footballers from Western Australia
Sydney Swans players
East Fremantle Football Club players
Boulder City Football Club players
Glenelg Football Club players
West Torrens Football Club players
West Torrens Football Club coaches
Australian rules football commentators
Australian police officers
Living people